This is a list of seasons played by Getafe CF in Spanish and European football, from its foundation in 1899 to the most recent completed season. It details the country achievements in major competitions, and the top scorers in league games for each season.

The club has been runners-up in the Copa del Rey twice, and played in the UEFA Cup / Europa League three times.

Key

Key to league record:
 Pos = Final position
 Pld = Matches played
 W = Matches won
 D = Matches drawn
 L = Matches lost
 GF = Goals for
 GA = Goals against
 Pts = Points

Key to divisions:
1ª = La Liga
2ª = Segunda División
2ª B = Segunda División B
3ª = Tercera División
1ª Reg. = Primera Regional
2ª Reg. = Segunda Regional
Pref. = Preferente Regional

Key to rounds:
 W = Winners
 RU = Runners-up
 SF = Semi-finals
 QF = Quarter-finals
 R16 = Round of 16
 R32 = Round of 32
 R64 = Round of 64

 R6 = Sixth round
 R5 = Fifth round
 R4 = Fourth round
 R3 = Third round
 R2 = Second round
 R1 = First round
 GS = Group stage

Seasons

References and notes

External links
Official website 
BDFutbol team profile

 
Getafe
 
Association football lists by Spanish club